Eight Bears Island is an island of the Arctic Archipelago, specifically of the Parry Islands subgroup of the Queen Elizabeth Islands. It belongs to the Northwest Territories, Canada.
It lies just east of Fitzwilliam Owen Island, south-west of the Ballantyne Strait. It is roughly halfway between Mackenzie King Island (to the north-east) and Emerald Isle (to the south-west).

External links
 Eight Bears Island in the Atlas of Canada - Toporama; Natural Resources Canada

Islands of the Queen Elizabeth Islands
Uninhabited islands of the Northwest Territories